Vega (previously known as Herdman) is an unincorporated community in Bloomfield Township, Jackson County, Ohio, United States.

The Herdman post office was established on May 16, 1890, and was discontinued on July 31, 1906.  Mail service is now handled through the Rempel branch.

References 

Unincorporated communities in Jackson County, Ohio